Bruvik is a former municipality in the old Hordaland county, Norway.  The municipality existed from 1870 until its dissolution in 1964. At the time of its dissolution, the municipality covered  on both sides of the Veafjorden, the innermost part of the Sørfjorden, including the southeastern part of the island of Osterøy.  The administrative centre of the municipality was the village of Bruvik where Bruvik Church is located.

History
The parish of Haus was established as a municipality on 1 January 1838 (see formannskapsdistrikt law). On 1 January 1870, the northeastern district of Haus (population: 2,062) was separated from Haus to form the new municipality of Bruvik.

During the 1960s, there were many municipal mergers across Norway due to the work of the Schei Committee. On 1 January 1964, the municipality of Bruvik was dissolved and its lands were split up as follows:
the area around the village of Bruvik on the island of Osterøy (population: 409) was merged with parts of the municipalities of Haus (population: 2,237), Hamre (population: 1,166), and Hosanger (population: 1,616) to create the new Osterøy Municipality. 
the rest of Bruvik (population: 5,264), was merged with a parts of the municipalities of Evanger (population: 251) and Modalen (population: 151) to create the new Vaksdal Municipality.

Municipal council
The municipal council  of Bruvik was made up of 37 representatives that were elected to four year terms.  The party breakdown of the final municipal council was as follows:

Coat of arms
The coat of arms was granted on 14 December 1960. The blue and white arms show a chevron symbol above a cogwheel which symbolizes industry. In 1964 when Bruvik municipality was dissolved, the new municipality of Vaksdal (which included the majority of the old Bruvik municipality) chose to continue using the old arms of Bruvik. Vaksdal used the arms until 1990 when new arms were adopted.

See also
List of former municipalities of Norway

References

External links
Bruvik website
Bruvik Church

Vaksdal
Osterøy
Former municipalities of Norway
1870 establishments in Norway
1964 disestablishments in Norway